Strategic Command WWII Pacific Theater is a grand strategy computer game developed by Canadian studio Fury Software, and published by Battlefront.com in 2008. The third game in the Strategic Command series, Pacific Theater is a turn-based strategy set in World War II, focusing – for the first time in the series – on Asia and the titular Pacific Theater. The player controls all of either Axis or Allied states.

Gameplay
Like the previous installment, Blitzkrieg, Pacific Theater is a turn-based strategy taking place on a map divided into squares (or "tiles"). It is the first game in the series not focusing on the European Theater of World War II, but rather taking place in the titular Pacific Theater.

The main campaign lasts from attack on Pearl Harbor until 1947, and takes place on a map stretching from Novosibirsk and Bangalore in the west to California in the east, and from Bering Strait in the North to the southern coast of New Zealand in the south.  The game also features eight "mini-campaigns", played on smaller maps, namely Battle of Midway, Kododa Trail, Philippines Campaign, Battles on Imphal and Kohima, Battle of Peleliu, Battle of Iwo Jima and Battle of Okinawa.

Notes and references

External links
 Strategic Command WWII Pacific Theater official website

2008 video games
Windows games
Windows-only games
Computer wargames
World War II grand strategy computer games
Battlefront.com games
Turn-based strategy video games
Grand strategy video games
Video games developed in Canada
Video games set in India
Video games set in Japan
Video games set in New Zealand
Video games set in Oceania
Video games set in Okinawa Prefecture
Video games set in Palau
Video games set in Papua New Guinea
Video games set in the Philippines
Video games set in Russia
Video games set in the Soviet Union
Video games set in the United States
Pacific War video games